The Archie Carr National Wildlife Refuge is part of the United States National Wildlife Refuge (NWR) System, located along a twenty-mile (30 km) section of coastline from Melbourne Beach to Wabasso Beach, Florida, along State Road A1A. The 900 acre (3.6 km2) refuge was established in 1991, to protect the loggerhead and green sea turtles.

Management
Since 2012 the Archie Carr NWR is administered as part of the Everglades Headwaters NWR Complex, along with Pelican Island NWR, Lake Wales Ridge NWR, and the Everglades Headwaters National Wildlife Refuge and Conservation Area, through a partnership with the Caribbean Conservation Corporation (a nonprofit turtle conservation group founded by Dr. Archie Carr himself) and Archie Carr Working Group.

Habitat
The refuge provides nesting habitats for approximately one-fourth of all sea turtles nesting in the United States. About 15,000-20,000 sea turtles nests are laid annually, mostly loggerheads, green sea turtles, and some leatherbacks. The refuge also provides habitat for several other threatened and endangered species.

Three centers within the sanctuary are run by Brevard County under the aegis of the restrictions established by the federal government.

Conservation efforts
Archie Carr NWR is threatened by sea level rise. Scientists and researchers are studying the impacts of sea level rise on this ecosystem.

Notes

External links

Archie Carr National Wildlife Refuge at U.S. Fish and Wildlife Service
U.S. Fish and Wildlife Service on climate and sea level rise in the Southeast US

Indian River Lagoon
Melbourne Beach, Florida
National Wildlife Refuges in Florida
Protected areas established in 1991
Protected areas of Brevard County, Florida
Protected areas of Indian River County, Florida
1991 establishments in Florida